John Newton is a Paralympic athlete from Australia. He competed in Wheelchair Fencing, Snooker and Table Tennis at the 1968 Tel Aviv Paralympics, winning a bronze medal in Snooker, after losing in the semi-final to the eventual gold medalist, Michael Shelton, of Great Britain. At the 1984 New York/Stoke Mandeville Paralympics he competed in Lawn Bowls, winning a bronze medal in the men's singles A6/8 event.

References

Paralympic lawn bowls players of Australia
Lawn bowls players at the 1984 Summer Paralympics
Paralympic bronze medalists for Australia
Living people
Medalists at the 1984 Summer Paralympics
Australian male bowls players
Year of birth missing (living people)
Medalists at the 1968 Summer Paralympics
Paralympic medalists in lawn bowls
Paralympic medalists in snooker